Plesovskaya is a rural locality (a village) in Velsk, Velsky District, Arkhangelsk Oblast, Russia. The population was 283 as of 2010. There is 1 street.

Geography 
Plesovskaya is located on the Vaga River, 2 km east of Velsk (the district's administrative centre) by road. Velsk is the nearest rural locality.

References 

Rural localities in Velsky District